Yagam is a 2010 Telugu film, directed by P.A. Arun Prasad starring Navdeep, Bhumika Chawla and Kim Sharma. The film was partially re-shot and released in Tamil as Sinam with scenes of Sathyaraj and Sathyan added in. The Tamil version released on 3 February 2012.

Cast
 Navdeep as Danny
 Bhumika Chawla as Nandini
 Kim Sharma as Sophie
 Rahul Dev as Sanjay Arya
 Ajay (Sathyaraj in Tamil)
 Harsha Vardhan as Chandramouli (Sathyan in Tamil)
 Ali
 Brahmanandam
 Raghu Babu

Critical reception 

123Telugu offered the following review:

References

External links
 

2010s Telugu-language films
2010 films
Films directed by P. A. Arun Prasad